Paduka Sri Sultan Rijaluddin Muhammad Shah ibni al-Marhum Sultan Sulaiman Shah II (died 4 October 1652) was the 13th Sultan of Kedah. His reign was from 1626 to 1652. He assumed the regency when his father was carried off to Aceh in 1619 as a prisoner. He appealed for help from the King of Siam, in an attempt to counter Acehnese hegemony. He removed his capital to Kota Naga in August 1626. He entered into diplomatic relations with the Dutch in Batavia. Hukum Kanun Kedah and Undang-Undang Pelabuhan Kedah which was a law very similar to Undang-Undang Melaka was written during his reign.

External links
 List of Sultans of Kedah

1652 deaths
17th-century Sultans of Kedah